The Grand Prix of Sharm el-Sheikh was a one-day road cycling race held annually in Egypt from 2007 to 2009. It was part of UCI Africa Tour as a category 1.2 event.

Winners

References

Cycle races in Egypt
2007 establishments in Egypt
Recurring sporting events established in 2007
2009 disestablishments in Egypt
Recurring sporting events disestablished in 2009
UCI Africa Tour races